The Northwest Jersey Athletic Conference (NJAC) is a sports league that includes 39 public and private high schools from Morris County, Sussex County and Warren County, New Jersey, that operates under the auspices of the New Jersey State Interscholastic Athletic Association.

The conference was formed in 2009 by the NJSIAA as part of a major statewide reorganization of athletic leagues and included schools that had previously been members of the Sussex County Interscholastic League as well as Morris County schools that had been part of the Colonial Hills Conference, Iron Hills Conference, and the Northern Hills Conference.  Two northern Warren County schools opted to leave the Skyland Conference to join the NJAC; Hackettstown joined when the conference formed, while North Warren officially became a member in the fall of 2012.

The NJAC sponsors competition in most high school sports, but not in football. The conference originally had football divisions, but merged with three other leagues in 2016 to form the North Jersey Super Football Conference (now simply known as the Super Football Conference).

Members of the Northwest Jersey Athletic Conference include:

Academy of Saint Elizabeth - Convent Station
Boonton High School - Boonton
Chatham High School - Chatham
Delbarton School – Morristown
Dover High School - Dover
Hackettstown High School - Hackettstown
Hanover Park High School - East Hanover
High Point Regional High School - Sussex
Hopatcong High School - Hopatcong
Jefferson Township High School - Oak Ridge
Kinnelon High School - Kinnelon
Kittatinny Regional High School - Newton
Lenape Valley Regional High School - Stanhope
Madison High School - Madison
Montville Township High School - Montville
Morris Catholic High School – Denville
Morris County School of Technology - Denville
Morris Hills High School - Rockaway
Morris Knolls High School – Rockaway
Morristown High School – Morristown
Morristown-Beard School - Morristown
Mount Olive High School - Flanders
Mountain Lakes High School - Mountain Lakes
Newton High School - Newton
North Warren Regional High School - Blairstown
Parsippany High School - Parsippany
Parsippany Hills High School - Parsippany
Pequannock Township High School - Pequannock
Pope John XXIII Regional High School - Sparta
Randolph High School - Randolph
Roxbury High School - Succasunna
Sparta High School - Sparta
Sussex County Technical High School - Sparta
Vernon Township High School - Vernon
Villa Walsh Academy - Morristown
Wallkill Valley Regional High School – Hamburg
West Morris Central High School - Chester
West Morris Mendham High School – Mendham
Whippany Park High School – Whippany

Former members of the Northwest Jersey Athletic Conference:

Butler High School - Butler (left NJAC after 2017-18 season)

References

External links
Northwest Jersey Athletic Conference

New Jersey high school athletic conferences
Sports organizations established in 2010
Sussex County, New Jersey
Morris County, New Jersey
Warren County, New Jersey
2010 establishments in New Jersey